Millboro Springs is an unincorporated community in Bath County, Virginia, in the United States.

The Old Stone House was listed on the National Register of Historic Places in 1983.

References

Unincorporated communities in Bath County, Virginia
Unincorporated communities in Virginia